Dunnavant, also spelled Dunavant, is a census-designated place and unincorporated community in Shelby County, Alabama, United States. Its population was 981 as of the 2010 census. The community's name is probably derived from a local family. A post office was established in 1897 and was in operation until it was closed in 1958.

Geography

Dunnavant is in central Alabama, in the southernmost extensions of the Appalachian Mountains along Alabama State Route 25 and Shelby County Road 41. Leeds is 6 mi (10 km) north, and the unincorporated community of Vandiver is 4 mi (6 km) southeast on a windy and mountainous route. Shelby County 41 leads southwest
as Dunnavant Valley Rd 15 mi (24 km) to Chelsea.

Demographics

References

Census-designated places in Shelby County, Alabama
Census-designated places in Alabama
Unincorporated communities in Alabama